Guled Abdirizak Ahmed (born 12 May 1996) is a Somali footballer who plays as a left back for English club Phoenix Sports F.C. and the Somalia national team.

Club career
On 26 January 2016, Ahmed signed for Cypriot club ASPIS Pyla, making one appearance in the 2015–16 STOK Elite Division. In January 2019, Ahmed made two league appearances for Egham Town. During the 2019–20 season, Ahmed played for Croatian clubs NK NAŠK and NK Zrinski Jurjevac. In December 2021, Ahmed signed for Phoenix Sports F.C.

International career
On 7 December 2019, Ahmed made his debut for Somalia in a 0–0 draw against Djibouti in the 2019 CECAFA Cup.

References

1996 births
Living people
Association football defenders
Somalian footballers
Somalia international footballers
Egham Town F.C. players